Monilispira circumcincta is a species of sea snail, a marine gastropod mollusc in the family Pseudomelatomidae, the turrids and allies.

Description

Distribution
This marine species occurs off Grenada and the Virgin Islands.

References

 Nowell-Usticke, G. W. "A supplementary listing of new shells (illustrated)." To be added to the check list of the marine shells of St. Croix. Published privately 6 (1969).

External links
 
 Gastropods.com: Crassispira (Monilispira) circumcincta

circumcincta
Gastropods described in 1969